Lisa Khoeblal-Malaihollo is a Dutch female badminton player, specializing in doubles play.

Achievements

BWF International Challenge/Series
Women's Doubles

 BWF International Challenge tournament
 BWF International Series tournament
 BWF Future Series tournament

References

External links
 
 

1987 births
Living people
Dutch people of Indonesian descent
Sportspeople from Tilburg
Dutch female badminton players
Lesbian sportswomen
Dutch LGBT sportspeople
LGBT badminton players